Calle Asell (born February 27, 1994) is a Swedish ice hockey player. He is currently playing with Örebro HK of the Swedish Hockey League (SHL).

Asell made his Swedish Hockey League debut playing with Örebro HK during the 2013–14 SHL season.

References

External links

1994 births
Living people
Örebro HK players
Swedish ice hockey forwards
People from Upplands Väsby Municipality
Sportspeople from Stockholm County